

Early life 
Isabel Martinez (born 1958, age 64) is a Mexican-American artist who was born in Alpoyeca, Guerrero, Mexico.  

In the 1980s, she immigrated from Mexico and to the United States in pursuit for a better life.   

Martinez is an artist who specializes in mixed media arts such as: painting, drawing, printmaking, and multi-cultural arts and crafts. She has participated in multiple group shows and solo exhibitions which are recognized internationally; her art is seen featured in numerous publications, books, catalogues, and more. 

Isabel is currently residing in Los Angeles, California.

Education 
In 1986, she attended Los Angeles City College to learn English and partake in the art curriculum. She then earned both a Masters in Fine Arts and a Single Subject Art Credential from California State University, Los Angeles, which allowed her to teach art at an elementary level. Additionally, she has received a Bachelors of Fine Arts from La Escuela Nacional de Artes Plasticas, Mexico City.

Art and notable works 
Her work revolves around her life as an immigrant in the U.S. and the hardships she's faced. As she assimilated into American culture, her artwork became 'brighter and colorful' as to how "dark and obscure" her work was prior to assimilating. Most of her shows take place in the United States. 

Coming from an indigenous community in Mexico, she chooses to highlight her indigeneity and indigenous cultures through the use of colors and traditions. Below are seven (7) series', and other artworks, she's composed, all mixed-media ranging from paintings, ceramics, etc. 

 Raza and Culture, 1995
 VG Got her Green Card, 2001

Virgins, 1997-2006
Myths And Realities in Color, 2009-2011
Day of the Dead, 1992-2009
My People, 1991-2003
Dreams, 2006-2011
Group Exhibitions
 Postales desde el Limbo, 2013
 Take a Tray!, 2016

Solo Exhibition

National Museum of Mexican Art
 Dia de Muertos: A Time to Grieve & Remember, Sep 10 - Dec 12, 2021, Group Exhibition 

Avenue 50 Studio, established in 2000, is a common city based gallery in Highland Park, which caters to showcasing and supporting latinx artists and the latinx community in general. 

Spirits of the Desert, 2018
Online: ¡Presente! An Homage to Author, Rudolfo Anaya, Oct 24 - Nov 27, 2020, group exhibition
Living Jewels, Jan 22 - Feb 26, 2022
This is a solo exhibition consisting of 25 paintings of insects such as: hummingbirds, beetles, butterflies, dragonflies, and more. The series was inspired by her childhood memories in the ranch life in Mexico, serving as a reminder of the importance of respecting and appreciating the environment; Martinez wants the viewers to consider the chaos that could come forth with the disappearance of these 'living jewels'.
Coming Out of the Dark, Jan 22 - Feb 26, 2022
This is a group exhibition consisting of twelve artists, including herself, which reflects on the effects of the Covid-19 pandemic for the past two years, 2020-2022. Considering the shutdown amidst of the pandemic, artists, such as Martinez, partook in creating pieces embarking the turbulent and unprecedented times of it. The exhibition allowed said artists to challenge their creative spirit, serving as a transition to a new era, an awakening, and "coming out of the dark" times presented. She was a student of the curator artist of the exhibition, Raoul De la Sota in 1986.

References 

1958 births
Living people
20th-century American women artists
21st-century American women artists
California State University, Los Angeles alumni
Wikipedia Student Program